Charlie Hayes Foster (June 20, 1905 – November 17, 1983) was an American football, basketball, and track and field coach. He served as the head football coach at Nebraska State Teachers College—now known as University of Nebraska–Kearney—from 1945 to 1952, compiling a record of 42–24–3. Foster was also the head basketball coach at Kearney State from 1944 to 1949, tallying a mark of 39–36. However, Foster's most pioneering role was a track and field coach. He is widely regarded as the "Father of Nebraska Cross Country". According to the Nebraska Sports Hall of Fame, "He featured girls' track events in meets before the sport was approved by the state and was the first to add the triple jump." The football field at Nebraska–Kearney bears his name.

Head coaching record

Football

References

External links
 

1905 births
1983 deaths
Nebraska–Kearney Lopers football coaches
Nebraska–Kearney Lopers men's basketball coaches
College track and field coaches in the United States